Körting is a surname. Notable people with the name include:

Georg Körting (1844–1919), German Chief Surgeon General of the Guards Corps in the First World War
Gustav Körting (1845–1913), German philologist
Heinrich Körting (1859–1890), German philologist
Otto Körting (1884–1959), German politician

See also
Körting Hannover, industrial engineering company in Hanover, Germany